Trichomyrmex criniceps is a species of ant in the subfamily Myrmicinae. It is found from India and Sri Lanka.

References

External links

 at antwiki.org
Animaldiversity.org

Myrmicinae
Hymenoptera of Asia
Insects described in 1879